The 1976 Texas A&M Aggies football team represented Texas A&M University during the 1976 NCAA Division I football season.

Schedule

Personnel

Season summary

Baylor
Tony Franklin kicked 65-yard field goal

at Arkansas

TCU

at Texas

Sun Bowl (vs. Florida)

References

Texas AandM
Texas A&M Aggies football seasons
Sun Bowl champion seasons
Texas AandM Aggies football